The 1917–18 Montreal Canadiens season was the team's ninth season and first as a member of the new National Hockey League (NHL). The Canadiens sided with other members of the National Hockey Association (NHA) and voted to suspend the NHA and start the NHL to expel the Toronto Blueshirts ownership. The Canadiens qualified for the playoffs by winning the first half of the season, but lost the playoff to the temporary Toronto franchise, made up of Blueshirts players.

Team business

The club changed its name to "Club de Hockey Canadien Ltd." from "Club Athletic Canadien". The logo on the jersey was changed to reflect this, substituting the "A" within the "C" with an "H".

Regular season
Quebec did not ice a team for the season. Quebec's players were dispersed by draft and Montreal chose Joe Hall, Joe Malone and Walter Mummery. Georges Vezina led the league in goals against average of 4 per game and Joe Malone had 44 goals in 20 games to lead the league in goals.

The team was forced to return to its former arena the Jubilee Rink after the Montreal Arena burned down on January 2, 1918. The rival Montreal Wanderers folded after the fire, leaving only three teams (Montreal, Ottawa and Toronto) to continue the season. The Wanderers' players were dispersed and the Canadiens picked up Billy Bell and Jack McDonald.

On January 28, 1918, when Canadiens visited Toronto, Toronto's Alf Skinner and Montreal's Joe Hall got into a stick-swinging duel. Both players received match penalties, $15 fines and were arrested by the Toronto Police for disorderly conduct, for which they received suspended sentences.

Final standings

 Wanderers defaulted scheduled games against the Canadiens (Jan. 2, 1918) and Toronto (Jan. 5, 1918), when their arena burned down. These appear as losses in the standings, but the games were not played.

Record vs. opponents

Schedule and results
First half

† Montreal Arena burned down and Wanderers withdraw. Two Wanderers games count
as wins for Canadiens and Toronto.

Second half

Playoffs
The Canadiens played the Torontos in a playoff to decide the league championship. In a two-game, total-goals series, Toronto won the first game 7–3 and Montreal won the second game 4–3. Toronto won the series 10–7 and proceeded to the Stanley Cup playoffs.

Toronto wins total goals series 10–7 for the O'Brien Cup

Player statistics

Skaters
Note: GP = Games played, G = Goals, A = Assists, Pts = Points, PIM = Penalties in minutes

†Denotes player spent time with another team before joining Montreal. Stats reflect time with the Canadiens only.

Goaltenders
Note: GP = Games played; TOI = Time on ice (minutes); W = Wins; L = Losses; T = Ties; GA = Goals against; SO = Shutouts; GAA = Goals against average

Awards and records

Transactions
acquired Joe Hall, Joe Malone and Walter Mummery from Quebec Bulldogs in Dispersal Draft, November 26, 1917
acquired Billy Bell,  Jack Marks and Jack McDonald from Montreal Wanderers in Dispersal Draft, January 4, 1918
loaned  Jack Marks to Toronto Arenas, January 4, 1918
signed Evariste Payer as a free agent, January 29, 1918

References

See also
 1917–18 NHL season
 List of Stanley Cup champions

Montreal Canadiens seasons
Montreal Canadiens
Mont